Thaiphantes is a genus of Southeast Asian sheet weavers that was first described by Alfred Frank Millidge in 1995.  it contains only two species, both found in Thailand: T. milneri and T. similis.

See also
 List of Linyphiidae species (Q–Z)

References

Araneomorphae genera
Linyphiidae
Spiders of Asia